U.S. Naval Air Station Cubi Point was a United States Navy aerial facility located at the edge of Naval Base Subic Bay and abutting the Bataan Peninsula in the Philippines.

When the base closed, the air station became Subic Bay International Airport and is still operating today.

Background 

During the Korean War, Admiral Arthur W. Radford, Chief of Naval Operations saw the need for a naval air station at Cubi Point. It was a rugged and jungle-covered finger of land  from Subic Naval Base. Radford believed the air station would be a vital link for the U.S. Navy in the Philippines.

In spite of the magnitude of the job and the tremendous difficulties the construction involved, the project was approved by The Pentagon. Civilian contractors were initially contracted to fulfill the project, but after seeing the forbidding Zambales Mountains and the maze of jungle at Cubi Point, they claimed it could not be done. The Navy's Seabees were then given the project in 1951. The first Seabees to arrive were MCB-3 on October 2, 1951; the second, MCB-5, arrived on November 5, 1951; the third, MCB-2 arrived early in 1952.  MCBs 9 and 11 followed later.

The first problem encountered was moving the fishing village of Banicain, which occupied a portion of the site for the new airfield. The town and its residents were moved to Olongapo, which became New Banicain. The former village of Banicain is now under  of earth.

The next, and biggest, issue was cutting a mountain in half and moving soil to fill in Subic Bay and create a  runway. It was one of the largest earthmoving projects in the world, equivalent to the construction of the Panama Canal. The construction project took five years and an estimated 20 million man-hours.

The $100-million facility (equivalent to $ million in ) was commissioned on July 25, 1956 and comprised an air station and an adjacent pier that was capable of docking the Navy's largest carriers. On December 21, 1972, Naval Air Station Cubi Point was renamed to honor Admiral Arthur W. Radford. Radford had the unusual honor of personally dedicating the facility. A plaque memorializing the occasion reads:

Operations 

Eventually, NAS Cubi Point served as the primary maintenance, repair and supply center for the 400 carrier-based aircraft of the Seventh Fleet's carrier force. During the Vietnam War, its jet engine shop turned out two jet engines per day to keep pace with demand.

NAS Cubi Point and Naval Base Subic Bay were also prominently used during Operations Desert Storm and Desert Shield.

Dependents were evacuated and the Navy began an intense clean-up effort to return the station to normal operations. Within two weeks, they returned the station back to limited operations. Within four weeks, the Navy had restored almost all services to most of the family housing. By September, most dependents had returned to Subic Bay and Cubi Point, but in the same month the Senate of the Philippines voted to require the United States to withdraw from all of its facilities in the Philippines. The withdrawal was completed in November 1992 and shortly after NAS Cubi Point became Cubi Point International Airport, later renamed Subic Bay International Airport. Upon closure, the vast collection of squadron memorabilia displayed in the Cubi Point Officers' Club was shipped to the National Museum of Naval Aviation at NAS Pensacola, Florida, and now forms the decor of the Cubi Bar Café, which opened in 1996 as the museum's restaurant.

Accidents and incidents
5 December 1971: P-3A Orion #152151 had 2 engines explode shortly after takeoff and ditched. 1 of the 16 occupants was killed.
31 October 1972: KA6D Intruder #151809 attached to VA-196 on USS Enterprise stalled and crashed on take-off into Subic Bay, both crew members killed.
2 November 1978: Lockheed S-3A 160590 crashed at night on Mount Slanging, two miles southwest of the Cubi Point Naval Air Station, having had taken off from the Cubi airfield seven minutes before on a training flight. 
26 June 1979: P-3B #154596 lost power to 2 engines after takeoff and crashed while attempting to return to land. 5 of the 15 occupants were killed.
29 January 1989: A-6E Intruder BuNo. 162189/'NF 502' of VA-115 'Eagles' based aboard the USS Midway (CV-41). Substantially damaged January 29, 1989 at NAS Cubi Point, Subic Bay, Philippines. A Fire erupted on the right side of the aircraft during refuelling in the NAS Cubi Point fuel pits ["hot-pits"]. Fuel nozzle didn't seal correctly. It was attached, but when they pressurized it, jet fuel went down the intake. (Unlike EA-6B Prowlers, the pilot of A-6E Intruders kept both engines turning during refuelling).  Of the two crew, the pilot, Lt Commander Dan “Aldo” Wendling egressed on ground. The Bombardier/Navigator, Jay "Tank" Cook ejected but did not survive due to tailwinds and being out of the seat operating envelope.  Reference: https://aviation-safety.net/wikibase/186149

See also 

 U.S. Naval Base Subic Bay
 U.S. Naval Station Sangley Point
 Subic Bay International Airport
 Military History of the Philippines
 Military History of the United States

References

External links 

Defunct airports in the Philippines
Military facilities in Bataan
United States Naval Air Stations
Naval Air Station Cubi Point
Airports established in 1956
Military installations established in 1951
1951 establishments in the Philippines
Military installations closed in 1992
1992 disestablishments in the Philippines
Closed installations of the United States Navy